Davit Gochaevich Chakvetadze (born 18 October 1992) is a Georgian-born Russian Greco-Roman wrestler. He moved to Russia in 2013 by the recommendation of Russian national Greco-Roman coach Gogi Koguashvili. Chakvetadze won gold at the 2016 Summer Olympics in the 85 kg category.

Career
At the 2015 Russian National Greco-Roman Wrestling Championships, in a match against Olympic Champion Aleksey Mishin, Davit won the gold medal. He is silver medalist at the 2015 FILA Wrestling World Cup - Men's Greco-Roman and gold medalist at the 2015 European Games in the 85 kg category. Davit won the European Nations' Cup (Moscow Lights) in 2015. Chakvetadze won 9–2 over World Champion Zhan Beleniuk at the Grand Prix Baku. He competed at the 2016 Summer Olympics, where in the final he again beat Ukrainian Zhan Beleniuk.

In 2020, he won the silver medal in the 87 kg event at the 2020 Individual Wrestling World Cup held in Belgrade, Serbia.

References

1992 births
Living people
Russian male sport wrestlers
Male sport wrestlers from Georgia (country)
Olympic wrestlers of Russia
Wrestlers at the 2016 Summer Olympics
Olympic gold medalists for Russia
Olympic medalists in wrestling
Medalists at the 2016 Summer Olympics
Wrestlers at the 2015 European Games
European Games gold medalists for Russia
European Games medalists in wrestling
Georgian emigrants to Russia
Russian people of Georgian descent
Russian sportspeople in doping cases